Michael Hayden (born January 15, 1943) is a Canadian artist who is noted for his artworks incorporating neon lighting.

Career 
Hayden was born in Vancouver, British Columbia, the son of a designer who moved to Toronto with his family. Hayden attended the Ontario College of Art and while there created a ten-room presentation of sights, sounds, and smells, called "Mind Excursion". His best-known commission is Sky's the Limit (1987) at O'Hare International Airport in Chicago's United Airlines terminal (see photograph). Other prominent commissions include Arc en Ciel (1978), which was formerly installed at Yorkdale subway station in Toronto, York Electric Murals at York University Libraries, and Quadrille (1996), which is installed on a building in Charlotte, North Carolina.

Hayden's work is in the public collections of many museums, including the Institute of Contemporary Art, University of Pennsylvania, Philadelphia; the National Gallery of Canada, Ottawa; and the Art Gallery of Ontario, Toronto.

References

Further reading
 This book includes photographs of Hayden's works and an interview with Hayden.
Greenwood, Michael (August–September 1971). Hayden's light/sound escalator at York University, Toronto." artscanada, 158–159.

1943 births
20th-century Canadian sculptors
Canadian male sculptors
20th-century Canadian male artists
Artists from Vancouver
Living people
Neon artists